Rob Walling is a serial entrepreneur, author, podcaster, and angel investor. He is the author of Start Small, Stay Small: A Developer's Guide to Launching a Startup, which was published in 2010.

Walling is the founder of email marketing software Drip that was acquired in a life-changing exit by Leadpages in July 2016.

Career 
In the early 2000s Walling tried to launch a number of software products that failed. He had his first notable success with DotNetInvoice, an invoicing software application. Subsequently, he launched other small business and formed an online community of software founders called Micropreneurs.

In 2010 he started a podcast with Mike Taber, which became one of the most popular startup podcasts in iTunes, called Startups for the Rest of Us. The next year, in June, he co-founded MicroConf, a conference for self-funded startups, which is held twice a year in Las Vegas and Europe.

In August 2011 Walling purchased and revamped HitTail, a web-based software as a service product that provides long tail keyword suggestions. Before purchasing HitTail, it had used a freemium business model to market the product. Walling stopped the freemium model and used traditional software marketing to bring in more paying users. He founded Drip, an email marketing tool that allows a user to send emails to their audience based on user behavior, in 2012.

Walling has become known as a supporter of self-funding or bootstrapping software companies that turn a profit, instead of raising funding from venture capitalists. Much of his writing focuses on tactics for growing software as a service startups.

In 2014, he wrote the foreword to Dan Norris' book, The 7-Day Startup: You Don't Learn Until You Launch.

In March 2015 Walling published one of his best-known essays titled The Stairstep Approach to Bootstrapping where he outlines a potentially safer, more structured approach to bootstrapping a startup by starting with small, simple product ideas and leveraging the revenue and experience earned from them to tackle more ambitious (and typically more financially rewarding) ideas.

This approach was the focus of a chapter of the 2015 book The End of Jobs: Money, Meaning and Freedom Without the 9-to-5 by Taylor Pearson.

On July 26, 2016, his company, Drip, was acquired by Leadpages for an undisclosed amount. He led the Drip product team, out of Leadpages’ Minneapolis headquarters, until April 2018.

In October 2018, Walling announced that he was starting the first startup accelerator designed for bootstrappers, called TinySeed.

References

External links
robwalling.com
Startups for the Rest of Us
Founder Cafe
Drip
TinySeed

Living people
American businesspeople
Date of birth missing (living people)
Year of birth missing (living people)